Toggl Track (formerly Toggl) is a time tracking software operated by Toggl OÜ, headquartered in Tallinn, Estonia, that offers online time tracking and reporting services through their website along with mobile and desktop applications. 

Toggl Track tracks time blocks, optionally labeled with a task, a project, and tags. Time can be tracked through a start/stop button, manual entry, or dragging and resizing time blocks in a calendar view. With the browser extension, Toggl Track has time tracking integrations with over 100 websites.

Details
Toggl was created in 2006 by Alari Aho and Krister Haav in Tallinn, Estonia. The service was initially developed for internal use. The co-founders were software developers and struggled to work out how much time they had spent on each of their clients. The founders then realised their clients loved it as well and so expanded the software to work for small groups, developers, and independent consultants. It is designed for several operating systems including iPhone, Android, Windows, Mac and Linux. Toggl employs more than 80 employees.

Time entries and active timers are synchronized in real-time via a cloud service to the website and various applications. Reporting features allow users to track the time spent on various projects and analyze productivity.

According to Alari Aho, Toggl's CEO and founder, the application has been fully self-funded from the start. The name was created using a random name generator.

In 2014, the company made the transition from a company based in Tallinn to an entirely remote business.

As of August 2016, Toggl had more than 1.6 million registered users.

The product is sold as software as a service, based on per-seat license, with monthly and annual plans.

Besides the official mobile apps, client apps by third-party developers have also been created using the public Toggl API, such as Timery for iOS.

On 7 September 2020, Toggl rebranded to Toggl Track, as the Toggl company merged with Teamweek (now Toggl Plan) and Hundred5 (now Toggl Hire).

Technology 
From the beginning, Toggl was based on Ruby on Rails. Starting in 2013, Toggl's began to operate on Google's programming language Go on the back-end. The frontend works on JavaScript (Backbone.js, Coffeescript). It also uses some HTML5 features (offline storage) and websockets to synchronize separate devices in real-time. The database operates on PostgreSQL and Redis. Phonegap is used for mobile devices, and Chromium for desktop.

See also
Comparison of time tracking software
Project management software

References

Further reading

External links

Software companies of Estonia
Time-tracking software
Web applications
Proprietary software
Project management software
Companies based in Tallinn
Remote companies